Lionel Carter Jr. (born July 8, 1992), better known as his stage name Yung Carter, is an American record producer from Anderson, South Carolina. His signature beat is from the single, "Type Of Way" by Rich Homie Quan. He has worked with artists such as French Montana, Rich Kidz, and Big K.R.I.T.

Early life and career

As a child, Carter, was interested in R&B and old school rap. He started to take music more seriously after he graduated from West-side High school and went to college at The Art Institute. Carter's roommate was into making beats as well. At first, Carter wanted to engineer and record for artists, but after seeing his roommate's work, it inspired him to start record producing.

In 2011, Carter dropped out of college and started to engineer and record for people, but he wasn't making the kind of money that he wanted to. With no other job, he started to sell his beats. His cousin Yung Jonez, used to criticize his music. Just to impress his cousin, Carter kept trying to make his beats sounds better. As Yung Carter's beats started to improve, Yung Jonez started to like his music. They developed a musical chemistry with each other. In May 2012, Carter sent rapper Rich Homie Quan eight beats to listen to. Rich Homie later told Carter via Instagram that he made a song with one of the beats he sent him. The specific beat ended up being the song "All I Need" from the Still Goin In mixtape.

It wasn't until Rich Homie sent him the track, that Carter was proud that his beats were being used. He also produced the "Investments" track from the same mixtape. He used a sample from a Luther Vandross song. Carter originally made the beat for Yung Jonez, but Jonez thought it was a good idea to send it to Rich Homie instead. In November, Carter made the beat to "Type Of Way" and sent it to Rich Homie. In December, Rich Homie Quan got back to him and it ended up being on the Still Goin In: Reloaded mixtape. Currently, Carter is often in Atlanta recording with different artists to get recognition and to make himself known in the music business.

Production discography

2011
Yung Jonez
"Down South Nigga" (featuring Fleetwood)
"Sideline" (featuring Stetson)

Old Child - Gwalla Muzik
"Fastline" (featuring Tracy T)

Jas B - Carter's Basement
"Kissing You" (featuring Tida)

2013
Rich Homie Quan - Still Goin In: Reloaded
"Investments" 
"All I Need"
"Type of Way"

Jas B
"Jealously" (featuring Ice Cxld)

Yung Gutta
"Wake Up, Count Up" (featuring Fabo)

2014
Domani Harris
"Roll With Me" (produced with Go Grizzly)

Kevin Gates - By Any Means
"Get Up on My Level"

Young Dro - Black Label
"Watch Out" (featuring Mac Boney)
"Grits" (featuring BG Marco) (produced with Go Grizzly)

Jas B
"What You Know" (featuring Yung Jonez)

J.R. Donato - North Pole
"Bundlez" (featuring Wiz Khalifa) (produced with Fr4ncis)

2015
Rich Homie Quan - If You Ever Think I Will Stop Goin' in Ask RR (Royal Rich)
"Eye"
Yung Ralph - "Money To Blow"

References

Living people
African-American record producers
American audio engineers
American hip hop record producers
Musicians from South Carolina
People from Anderson, South Carolina
Southern hip hop musicians
Warner Music Group artists
1992 births
21st-century African-American people
FL Studio users